The European Citizen Action Service (ECAS) is a Brussels-based non-profit organisation that aims to empower European Union's citizens, by promoting and defending their rights and making it easier for them to participate in deliberations and decision-making of the European Union's political institutions. It is a strong proponent of EU citizen rights and European democracy and is currently headed by its Executive Director Assya Kavrakova.

Further reading
Kavrakova, A.; Lessenski, M.; Long, E.; Longton, H.; Weber, L.; Westerweel, M.; (2019) Societies outside Metropolises: the role of civil society organisations in facing populism, Commissioned by the European Economic and Social Committee (EESC) Diversity Europe Group, carried out by ECAS.
Nicolaou, A. (2018) Freedom of Movement in the EU: A Look Behind the Curtain, ECAS.
Lironi, E.; Peta, D. (2017)EU public consultations in the digital age: Enhancing the role of the EESC and civil society organisations , Commissioned by the European Economic and Social Committee, carried out by ECAS.
Traser, J. (2006) European Citizen Action Service (ECAS): Who’s Still Afraid of EU Enlargement?, Brussels: ECAS.

References

External links
European Citizen Action Service

Advice organizations